The Catalan Coastal Range is a system of mountain ranges running parallel to the Mediterranean Sea coast in Catalonia, Spain. It is part of the Catalan Mediterranean System. Its main axis runs between the Foix River and the Roses Gulf and the average altitude is around 500 m. The highest point is 763 m at the Montnegre.

Mountain ranges
From North to South:
Montgrí
Gavarres
Massís de l'Ardenya
Serra de Marina
Montnegre Massif
Serra del Corredor
Serra de Sant Mateu
Serra de la Conreria
Serra de Collserola
Massís del Garraf

Further south there are certain coastal mountain ranges like los Dedalts, Moles del Taix and Serra de la Mar in the Tivissa-Vandellòs Mountains and the Serra del Montsià that are included in the Catalan Pre-Coastal Range owing to the geological continuity with that range despite their seaside location.

Ecology
There are a few protected areas in the Catalan Coastal Range, like Parc Natural del Montnegre i el Corredor, Parc de Collserola and Parc Natural del Garraf.
At the same time though there are several areas subject to severe land degradation, owing mainly to stone quarrying, rubbish dumps and urban sprawl.

See also
Tibidabo

References

External links
Geologia de la Selva - Unitats de relleu
Muntanyes de Tivissa-Vandellòs
Neotectonic features of the Catalan Coastal Ranges

Mountain ranges of Catalonia